Short order may refer to:

Short Order, a 2005 Irish drama film
Short order cooking
Short Orders, a 1923 film
Short Order / Eggsplode!, a 1989 Famicom/NES video game by Tose